The 1971 EuroHockey Club Champions Cup was the third unofficial edition of Europe's premier field hockey competition. It took place in Rome as a group stage, which was won by SC 1880 Frankfurt's hockey team. It was the first of five titles in a row.

Standings
  SC 1880 Frankfurt
  MDA Roma
  Club Egara (defending champion)
  Barcelona
  Royal Leopold Club
  Lyon
  Tilburg MHC
  Lisnagarvey
  Rot-Weiss Wettingen
  Kil. Sörgyár
  Bohemians Prague
  Warta Poznań

References

See also
European Hockey Federation

EuroHockey Club Champions Cup
International field hockey competitions hosted by Italy
EuroHockey Club Champions Cup
EuroHockey Club Champions Cup